The Intergovernmental Agreement on Dry Ports is a 2013 United Nations treaty designed to promote the cooperation of the development of dry ports in the Asia-Pacific region. It was concluded under the auspices of the United Nations Economic and Social Commission for Asia and the Pacific (UNESCAP) and is open to ratification by any state that is a UNESCAP member.

The agreement aims to promote "international recognition of dry ports, facilitating investment in dry port infrastructure, improving operational efficiency and enhancing the environmental sustainability of transport."

Creation
The Agreement was adopted in Bangkok on 1 May 2013 by a resolution of UNESCAP and was opened for signature on 7 November 2013. It remained open for signature until 31 December 2014 and entered into force on 23 April 2016, after having been ratified by the requisite eight states.

Status
, the Agreement has been signed by 17 states. It has been ratified or acceded to by 11 states: Afghanistan, Bangladesh, China, India, Kazakhstan, Mongolia, Russia, South Korea, Tajikistan, Thailand, Turkmenistan, and Vietnam. It entered into force on 23 April 2016.

Content
The Agreement identifies a number of existing and potential dry port locations that are to be the basis of a coordinated effort to creates nodes along an international integrated intermodal transport and logistics system. Annex I of the Agreement identifies the dry ports subject to the agreement, and Annex II contains the principles underlying the development and operation of these ports.

Annex I dry ports
The following dry ports are identified in Annex I of the Agreement. Potential dry port locations are italicised. "ICD" is an abbreviation for "Inland Container Port". Many of the locations are situated on the border between two states. Once the Agreement enters into effect, the Annex I list can be amended by a two-thirds vote of the state parties to the Agreement.

Afghanistan

Armenia

Azerbaijan

Bangladesh

Bhutan

Cambodia

China

Georgia
Poti Free Industrial Zone, Poti
Tbilisi International Logistics Centre, Tbilisi

India

Indonesia
Gedebage Dry Port, Bandung
Cikarang Dry Port, Bekasi

Iran

Kazakhstan

Kyrgyzstan
Alamedin, Bishkek
Osh, Osh

Laos

Malaysia

Mongolia

Myanmar (Burma)

Nepal

Pakistan

Philippines

Russia

South Korea
Uiwang ICD, Uiwang

Sri Lanka
Peliyagoda, Colombo
Telangapata, Colombo

Tajikistan

Thailand

Turkey

Vietnam

References

External links
Intergovernmental Agreement on Dry Ports, information page at unescap.org
Text
Signatures and ratifications, at depositary

Intergovernmental Agreement on Dry Ports
Intergovernmental Agreement on Dry Ports
Intergovernmental Agreement on Dry Ports
Transport treaties
 
Treaties of Afghanistan
Treaties of Bangladesh
Treaties of the People's Republic of China
Treaties of India
Treaties of Kazakhstan
Treaties of Mongolia
Treaties of Russia
Treaties of South Korea
Treaties of Tajikistan
Treaties of Thailand
Treaties of Turkmenistan
Treaties of Vietnam
Intergovernmental Agreement on Dry Ports